Jonas Švedas ( in Liepāja – 15 October 1971 in Vilnius) was a Lithuanian and Soviet composer. He was named a People's Artist of the USSR in 1954.

References

1908 births
1971 deaths
Musicians from Liepāja
People from Courland Governorate
Lithuanian composers
People's Artists of the USSR
Soviet composers
Soviet male composers
20th-century classical musicians
20th-century composers
20th-century male musicians